Savage Africa is a 1950 French film directed by Jacques Dupont.

The film is also known as Congolaise (American new title).

Plot summary

Cast 
Robert St. John as Narrator
Ray Morgan as Narrator

Soundtrack

References

External links 

1950 films
French documentary films
1950s French-language films
French black-and-white films
Visual anthropology
1950 documentary films
1950s English-language films
1950s French films